Arravale Rovers GAA is Gaelic Athletic Association (GAA) club in County Tipperary, Ireland. Based in the town of Tipperary, it competes at senior level in Tipperary GAA county and divisional hurling and Gaelic football championships and leagues. Now part of the West Division of Tipperary GAA, it formerly played in the South Division Up to 1930. The Club has an illustrious history and was one of the leading clubs during the foundation era of the GAA,  winning the All-Ireland Senior Football Championship in its formative years.

History
The club was founded in 1885, a year after the formation of the GAA and within 10 years were All-Ireland Senior Football Champions.  During their first decade,  it was said that Tipperary Town had the strongest clubs in Ireland due to the presence of Bohercrowe and Rosanna.  Bohercrowe winning the All-Ireland SFC in 1889, thus paving the way for Arravale's glorious year of 1895.

Gaelic football
In 1895, Arravale Rovers won the All-Ireland Football Final, representing Tipperary. This was the first football final played at Jones' Road (later Croke Park).

In 2011 Arravale Rovers beat Éire Óg Annacarty by 1-7 to 0-7 to win the West Tipperary Senior Football Championship for the first time since 1993. The Title was lost in 2012 to Éire Óg, Annacarty who won their first Divisional title in that year. However, Rovers came good again in 2013 when defeating old rivals, Galtee Rovers of Bansha in the final, played at Lattin. This win brought the club's tally in the Divisional Senior Football Championship roll of honour to 11, including the often disputed victory of 1942 which the club always claim to have won, though a scarcity of records give credence to the notion that they were the only team affiliated at senior level in that season. The Club also won further  championships in 2015 and 2017 has now surpassed the Lattin-Cullen Club near the top of the honours list, with Galtee Rovers topping the roll of honour with 25 wins.

Honours
All-Ireland Senior Football Championship (1)
1895
Munster Senior Football Championship (1)
1895
 Tipperary Senior Football Championship (6)
1894, 1895, 1896, 1899, 1941, 1985
Tipperary Intermediate Football Championship (2)
1988, 2007
Tipperary Junior Football Championship (1)
1997
Tipperary Under-21 Football Championship (3)
1972, 1973, 2011
Tipperary Under-21 'B' Football Championship (1)
2002
Tipperary Minor Football Championship (11)
1933, 1959, 1966, 1972, 1980, 1986, 1988, 1991, 1997, 2004, 2007
West Tipperary Senior Football Championship (14)
 1942, 1948, 1955, 1972, 1973, 1981, 1984, 1992, 1993, 2011, 2013, 2015, 2017, 2022.
South Tipperary Senior Football Championship (2)
1936, 1941
West Tipperary Junior Football Championship (9)
1933, 1945, 1953, 1965, 1980, 1986, 1987, 1988, 1997
 Tipperary Junior B Football Championship (1) 
 2016
West Tipperary Junior 'B' Football Championship (2)
 2008, 2016
West Tipperary Under-21 Football Championship (16)
 1959, 1971, 1972, 1973, 1987, 1988, 1989, 1994, 2005, 2009, 2010, 2011, 2012, 2013, 2016 & 2019
West Tipperary U-21 'B' Football Championship (1)
 2002
West Tipperary Minor Football Championship (25)
1933, 1942, 1954, 1955, 1957, 1959, 1964, 1967, 1969, 1972, 1980, 1986, 1988, 1991, 1992, 1997, 2002, 2004, 2005, 2006, 2007, 2008, 2009, 2010, 2013
South Tipperary Minor Football Championship (3)
1934, 1939, 1949
Tipperary Man's Cup County Senior Football League (1)
1936
West Tipperary Senior Football League (O'Donoghue Cup) (6)
1973, 1975, 1987, 1992, 1993, 2004
West Tipperary Junior Football League (2)
1984, 1985

Hurling
In 1997, Arravale Rovers won the Tipperary Intermediate Hurling Championship final with a very experienced team which had challenged for a number of years before.  A period followed without success. In 2009 the Rovers reached the Intermediate county final against Carrick Davins, but lost 1-13 to 1-6. They also reached the Minor hurling final against Loughmore-Castleiney.

Honours
Tipperary Intermediate Hurling Championship (1)
1997
Tipperary Junior Hurling Championship (2)
1926, 2020
Tipperary Minor B Hurling Championship (1)
2012
West Tipperary Senior Hurling Championship (2)
1966, 1970
West Tipperary Intermediate Hurling Championship (7)
1986, 1988, 1989, 1991, 1995, 1997, 2013
West Tipperary Junior Hurling Championship (3)
1934, 1964, 2020
South Tipperary Junior Hurling Championship (1)
1926 (amalgamation with Solohead)
West Tipperary Junior No. 2 Hurling Championship (1)
1958
West Tipperary Junior 'B' Hurling Championship (1)
2011
West Tipperary Under-21 Hurling Championship (2)
1959, 2011
West Tipperary Under-21 'B' Hurling Championship (1)
2004
West Tipperary Minor Hurling Championship (4)
1933, 1958, 2006, 2009
West Tipperary Minor B Hurling Championship (4)
1984, 1996, 2011, 2012

Notable players
John O'Donoghue (hurler)
Tommy Gleeson (footballer)

References

Further reading
 Tom O'Donoghue, Arravale Rovers H. & F. Club: the Arravale Rovers story: the G.A.A. in the parish of Tipperary (1995) 
 Marcus De Búrca, The GAA: a history (1999)

External links
Tipperary GAA website
Arravale Rovers GAA Club website

Hurling clubs in County Tipperary
Gaelic football clubs in County Tipperary
Gaelic games clubs in County Tipperary